The 2009 Mediterranean Games football tournament was the 16th edition of the Mediterranean Games men's football tournament. The football tournament was held in Pescara, Italy between 25 June and 5 July 2009 as part of the 2009 Mediterranean Games and was contested by 12 teams, all countries were represented by the U-20 teams. Spain won the gold medal.

Participating teams

System
The 12 teams were divided into four groups of three teams. Teams were awarded three points for a win and one for a draw. No points were awarded for a defeat. The top side in each group would advance to the semi-finals. If two or more teams were tied for a particular position, then the tie-breaking system would be as follows:
 Highest number of points obtained in all group matches;
 The result in the eventual direct match between two tied teams;
 Goal difference in all group matches;
 Greatest number of goals scored in all group matches.

Squads

Each team's eighteen-man squad had to consist of players born after January 1, 1989. The squads must have been submitted no later than June 11, 2009. Each member of the winning team was awarded a gold medal. The runners-up all received a silver medal, and the third-placed team all received a bronze medal. Each member of each side placed 4th-8th in the competition received a diploma.

Venues
6 stadia were allocated to host the matches

Draw
The draw for the groups was made on May 8, 2009, and was conducted by Eusebio Di Francesco

Tournament

Group stage

Group A

Group B

Group C

Morocco withdrew from the competition so Lybia and Montenegro ensured qualification to the next round. Their matches only determined group ranking.

Group D

Knockout stage

Semi-finals

5–8 Places

Seventh place match

Fifth place match

Third place match

Final

Final standings

References

 
Sports at the 2009 Mediterranean Games
Mediterranean Games
2009